Ölbach is a river of North Rhine-Westphalia, Germany. It is a right tributary of the Berkel near Vreden.

The Ölbach is one of the few outcrops of this region due to the topographic nature (gentle hills and flat land) of the Münsterland and is known for its numerous finds of belemnites. In its upper and middle reaches it exposes the gray clay layers belonging the Alb (Lower Cretaceous), and its many fossils.

See also
List of rivers of North Rhine-Westphalia

References

Rivers of North Rhine-Westphalia
Rivers of Germany